Sparrows is a 1926 American silent film about a young woman who rescues a baby from kidnappers. The film, which was originally titled Scraps, starred and was produced by Mary Pickford, who was the most powerful woman in Hollywood at the time.

Plot
Most of the children are orphans. One mother sends her child a doll, but Grimes crushes its head and tosses it into the swamp.

The children are ordered to hide any time someone comes to the farm. When a hog buyer shows up, Ambrose, the Grimeses' son, maliciously prevents Splutters, one of the children, from hiding. The buyer then purchases the boy from Grimes.

Molly has promised the others that God will rescue them. When a boy asks why nothing has happened after a month, she tells him that He is busy attending to sparrows (a biblical reference).

Ambrose catches Molly with stolen potatoes, so she and the others are given no supper. She pleads for the children, especially the sick, youngest baby, to no avail. Late that night, in a vision, Christ enters the barn where they sleep and takes the baby. When Molly wakes up, the child is dead.

Joe Bailey and his associate bring a kidnapped baby girl to the farm for concealment until they receive a ransom from the rich father, Dennis Wayne. When Grimes reads about the kidnapping in the newspaper several days later, he decides it is safer to chuck the baby into the swamp.

When Ambrose grabs the little girl to carry out the plan, Molly gets her back.  After she fights off Grimes with a pitchfork, he strands her in the hayloft and decides he must get rid of her, too.

That night, Molly flees with the children. Grimes finds this hilarious; he figures either the mud or the alligators will take care of the children. However, when the kidnappers come back for the baby, he leads them on a search.

Meanwhile, Splutters is brought to the police station, having been discovered by one of the search parties. He tells the policemen and Mr. Wayne about the baby farm.

Molly and the kids emerge unscathed from the swamp and hide aboard a boat, unaware it belongs to the kidnappers. Pursued by the police, Grimes runs into the swamp, but falls into deep mud and perishes, while the two criminals flee in the boat.  Unable to shake the harbor patrol, they try to slip away in a dinghy, but are run over and drown.

The baby is reunited with her wealthy father, but when she refuses to drink her milk without Molly, Mr. Wayne offers Molly a comfortable home. She accepts only on condition that he take in the other children as well.

Cast
 Mary Pickford as Molly 
 Roy Stewart as Dennis Wayne 
 Mary Louise Miller as Doris Wayne (the baby) 
 Gustav von Seyffertitz as Mr. Grimes
 Charlotte Mineau as Mrs. Grimes 
 Spec O'Donnell as Ambrose Grimes
 Lloyd Whitlock as Joe Bailey, alias Stone 
 Monty O'Grady as Splutters

Children:
 Billy Butts
 Jack Lavine
 Billy "Red" Jones
 Muriel McCormac
 Florence Rogan
 Mary McLain
 Sylvia Bernard
 Seesel Ann Johnson
 Camille Johnson

Cast notes:
Sparrows was Pickford's next-to-last silent role; it was followed by 1927's My Best Girl.  After that, Pickford did some talking pictures before retiring to "Pickfair", her estate with husband Douglas Fairbanks.

Production

However, Hal Mohr, the film's director of photography, debunked this story, saying "There wasn't an alligator within ten miles of Miss Pickford," and revealing in precise detail how the effect was done.

An earlier version of the "Jesus in the barn" scene was filmed in which the dead baby's spirit was carried to Heaven by a phosphorescent angel. The scene was rejected in favor of the Jesus take.

Critical reception

 Film historian Jeffrey Vance considers Sparrows to be Pickford's masterpiece. In his program notes for the Giorante del Cinema Muto (also knows as the Pordenone Silent Film Festival,) Vance writes in 2008: “Sparrows is her most fully realized and timeless work of art.  The film’s superb performances, gothic production design, and cinematography all serve a suspenseful, emotionally compelling story anchored by a central performance by Pickford herself imbued with pathos, humor, and charm.”

Accolades
 2003: AFI's 100 Years...100 Heroes & Villains:
 Molly – Nominated Hero
 2006: AFI's 100 Years...100 Cheers – Nominated

Home media
Milestone Film & Video released the Library of Congress restoration of Sparrows to DVD and Blu-ray on November 6, 2012, as part of a box set called  Rags and Riches: Mary Pickford Collection, and contains an audio commentary track by film historians Jeffrey Vance and Tony Maietta.

References
Notes

External links

 
 
 
 Sparrows at Allmovie.com
 Sparrows at silentsaregolden.com

1926 films
1926 drama films
American black-and-white films
Silent American drama films
American silent feature films
Films about orphans
Films directed by William Beaudine
United Artists films
1920s American films